Any Number Can Play is a 1949 drama film directed by Mervyn LeRoy. It is based on Edward Harris Heth's novel of the same name. It stars Clark Gable and Alexis Smith.

Plot
Casino owner Charley Enley Kyng (Clark Gable) is advised by his physician to slow down, after being diagnosed with angina pectoris, a heart disease. Charley supports his own family as well as his wife's sister, Alice (Audrey Totter) and her husband, Robbin (Wendell Corey). Charley quits drinking and smoking and vows to spend more time with his wife and son.

Brother-in-law Robbin, a dealer at Charley's casino, cannot pay a $2,000 gambling debt he owes to a gangster, who sends his goons Lew Debretti (Richard Rober) and Frank Sistina (William Conrad) after him. The dealer uses loaded dice to let them win at craps. Charley's son Paul (Darryl Hickman) expresses shame about his father's line of work to his mother, Lon (Alexis Smith). Charley tries to take his son on a fishing trip in the mountains, but the boy refuses. A dissatisfied couple, Mr. and Mrs. Lorgan, claim they have lost their entire savings at his casino and demand their money back. Charley does not agree, and Lon feels bad about the way they make their living.

Charley is depressed by the breakdown of his personal life but still rejects a proposition from a former girlfriend, Ada (Mary Astor), who suggests they renew their relationship. Paul gets into a brawl at the prom because of his father's business and is arrested. Charley gets his son out of jail, but Paul will not speak with him.

Paul follows his mother in the evening to the casino. A big-time gambler named Jim Kurstyn (Frank Morgan) is about to win enough to bankrupt the whole casino. Committed to fairness, Charley refuses to shut the game down and lets the man bet as much as he wants. As Jim eventually loses all his winnings, the gangster's goons try to rob the place. With the help of his son and supportive regulars, Charley manages to overpower the goons. Father and son reconcile and the family's happiness is restored. Charley then wagers against his casino staff for the entire casino operation. They draw cards; Charley loses by concealing his winning card. Charley, Lon and Paul walk happily away arm in arm.

Cast

 Clark Gable as Charley Enley Kyng
 Alexis Smith as Lon Kyng
 Wendell Corey as Robbin Elcott
 Audrey Totter as Alice Elcott
 Frank Morgan as Jim Kurstyn
 Mary Astor as Ada
 Lewis Stone as Ben Gavery Snelerr
 Barry Sullivan as Tycoon
 Marjorie Rambeau as Sarah Calbern
 Edgar Buchanan as Ed
 Leon Ames as Dr. Palmer
 Mickey Knox as Pete Senta
 Richard Rober as Lew "Angie" Debretti
 William Conrad as Frank Sistina
 Darryl Hickman as Paul Enley Kyng
 Caleb Peterson as Sleigh
 Dorothy Comingore as Mrs. Purcell
 Art Baker as Mr. Reardon

Release
According to MGM records the film earned $2,466,000 in the US and Canada and $739,000 overseas resulting in a profit of $763,000.

References

External links
 
 
 
 

1949 films
1949 drama films
American drama films
American black-and-white films
Films based on American novels
Films directed by Mervyn LeRoy
Films produced by Arthur Freed
Films scored by Lennie Hayton
Films about gambling
Metro-Goldwyn-Mayer films
1940s American films